Kevin Anderson Vechiatto da Silva (born 12 July 2006) is a Brazilian actor and comedian, known for Cúmplices de um Resgate, Monica and Friends: Bonds, and Nobody's Looking.

Career
He started in 2014, in Os Amigos, playing the character Jorge. Then, in 2015, he made his TV debut in Cúmplices de um Resgate as Felipe Vaz, then acted as Nicolau, in the first phase of O Rico e Lázaro. In 2017, he was chosen to play Jimmy Five in Monica and Friends: Bonds.

Filmography

Television

Film

References

External links
 
 

 
2006 births
Living people
Brazilian male child actors
Male actors from São Paulo